Don or Donald Taylor may refer to:

Entertainment
Don Taylor (American filmmaker) (1920–1998), actor and director
Don Taylor, American bass vocalist with Foggy River Boys/The Marksmen in 1954
Don Taylor (English director and playwright) (1936–2003), stage, television and film producer
Don Taylor (sportscaster) (born 1959), Canadian television and radio presenter

Politics
Donald S. Taylor (1898–1970), judge of the New York Supreme Court
Don Taylor (Australian politician) (born 1928), Deputy Premier of Western Australia
Don L. Taylor (born 1931), Canadian MP for Cowichan—Malahat—The Islands
Donald Taylor (Yukon politician) (1933–2012), Speaker of the Yukon Legislative Assembly
Donald L. Taylor (1915–1987), American politician in the New York State Assembly

Sports
Don Taylor (footballer) (1920–1994), Australian rules half-back
Don Taylor (cricketer) (1923–1980), New Zealand cricketer

Other
Donald Taylor (aviator) (1918–2015), American pioneering pilot
E. Don Taylor (1937–2014), Jamaican-born Episcopal Bishop of Virgin Islands
D. Taylor (born 1950s), American labor union leader